Vhakka Eddy Stelh Gnahoré (born 14 November 1993) is a French professional footballer who plays as a midfielder for Italian  club Ascoli.

He began his professional career in England with Birmingham City, for whom he played in the FA Cup, and then moved to Italy where he spent one-and-a-half seasons with Carrarese. He joined Napoli in January 2016, and was immediately loaned to Carpi, but before making an appearance for them, he was involved in a car accident and missed the rest of the season. He spent the first half of 2016–17 on loan to Crotone before being recalled by Napoli and immediately loaned to Perugia. In July 2017, he signed a four-year contract with Palermo. He returned to France with Amiens, initially on loan, and then spent the 2020 season with Chinese Super League club Wuhan Zall.

He has represented France at under-18 level.

Club career
Gnahoré was born in Villeneuve-la-Garenne, in the Paris suburbs, of Ivorian descent. As a youngster, he played for C.O. Savigny, from 2000 to 2003, and then for Morangis-Chilly until he joined the Paris Centre de Formation in November 2005. He remained there until 2008, when he joined the youth system of Châteauroux. After one season, he moved to England where he joined Manchester City's youth system in July 2009. When he decided to leave Manchester City, he joined Birmingham City's Academy, whose then director, Terry Westley, described him as "not really a Vieira because he's not a tackler. He's more a number 10 who can also do a shift in midfield." When he turned 18, in November 2011, Gnahoré signed his first professional contract, to run until 2014.

He was given a first-team squad number in January 2012, and his first competitive involvement came when he was named among the substitutes for the third-round FA Cup replay against Wolverhampton Wanderers, remaining unused.

Gnahoré made his first-team debut on 28 January, coming on as an 80th-minute substitute for Chris Burke in the fourth-round FA Cup-tie against Sheffield United at Bramall Lane, with Birmingham already 4–0 ahead. He ruptured his anterior cruciate ligament in training in February, and was predicted to be out of football for as much as nine months. He returned to first-team consideration when given a squad number and a place on the bench for the visit to Leeds United in the third round of the FA Cup in January 2013. In August 2013, Gnahoré had a trial with Mansfield Town, and on the last day of the summer transfer window, his contract with Birmingham City was terminated by mutual consent.

After leaving Birmingham, Gnahoré had trials with clubs including Troyes, Saint-Étienne and Olympique Marseille, before signing for Italian third-tier club Carrarese in July 2014. He became a regular selection in their first team, and scored his first goal in his ninth league match, a header to give his team a second-half lead against Santarcangelo on 26 October, but the visitors equalised in stoppage time.

On 26 January 2016, Gnahoré signed for Napoli, who immediately loaned him to fellow Serie A club Carpi until the end of the 2016–17 season. While driving home from training on 13 February, Gnahoré was involved in a serious accident when his car struck a lorry. He was taken to hospital by air ambulance. He was reported to have suffered injuries to head and pelvis which were not life-threatening. The injuries kept him out for the rest of the season, at the end of which Carpi were relegated and Gnahoré returned to his parent club.

He was loaned to another Serie A club, the newly promoted Crotone, for the 2016–17 season, and finally made his Crotone and Serie A debut on 14 January 2017, as a 64th-minute substitute in a 1–0 home defeat against Bologna. That was Gnahoré's only first-team appearance for the club. On the last day of the transfer window, Napoli recalled him and immediately loaned him to Perugia of Serie B until the end of the 2017–18 season. He made his debut in the starting eleven for the visit to Ternana, a match which Perugia won 1–0, but his appearance drew a protest from Ternana about his eligibility. League rules allow a player to register for no more than three member clubs in the same season. Perugia argued that, if a player is recalled from loan by his parent club and loaned to another club on the same day, the brief time technically spent with the parent does not count towards the three. The league ruled in Perugia's favour, but Ternana planned to appeal to a higher authority. Once confirmed as a Perugia player, he appeared in two-thirds of their remaining matches, and scored once, in a 2–2 draw with Pisa.

Gnahoré signed a four-year contract with another Serie B club, Palermo, in July 2017. According to the Corriere dello Sport, the fee was €1.5 million and Napoli had a buy-back clause included in the deal. He contributed 4 goals from 35 appearances as Palermo finished fourth but lost out in the play-off final.

He then returned to his native France where he signed on loan for Ligue 1 club Amiens for the season. The deal included an option to purchase. He made his debut in the starting eleven for the opening match of the 2018–19 Ligue 1 campaign, a 2–0 defeat away to Olympique Lyonnais, and on his third appearance, opened the scoring in a 4–1 win against Reims, collecting the ball with his back to goal and deceiving the goalkeeper from close range. Amiens redeemed the player at the end of the season.

He was loaned to Chinese Super League club Wuhan Zall for the 2020 season; the contract included an option to purchase. After a lengthy wait for the season to start after COVID-19 pandemic-related delays, he played regularly, making 14 appearances between August and October and scoring once. He was injured on 29 October, in what proved to be his last game for Wuhan Zall, and underwent cruciate ligament surgery in December.

Gnahoré returned to Amiens for pre-season training in 2021, but six matches into the 2021–22 Ligue 2 season, head coach Philippe Hinschberger still did not consider him physically ready for competitive football. He made his first appearance of the season on 23 October, as a late substitute, his first start came a month later, and although he had been expected to leave in January, he gradually resumed a regular place in the starting eleven and stated that he was happy at the club and the best thing for him would be to stay.

On 31 August 2022, Gnahoré returned to Italy and signed a two-year contract with Ascoli.

International career
Gnahoré played twice for the France under-18 team. He played the first half of a friendly match against the Belgium under-18s on 25 January 2011, and two days later appeared as a late substitute against the same opponents.

Career statistics

References

External links
 
 Profile of former players, dated August 2012, at the Centre de Formation de Football de Paris website

1993 births
Living people
People from Villeneuve-la-Garenne
Footballers from Hauts-de-Seine
French footballers
French sportspeople of Ivorian descent
France youth international footballers
Association football midfielders
FC Morangis-Chilly players
LB Châteauroux players
Manchester City F.C. players
Birmingham City F.C. players
Carrarese Calcio players
S.S.C. Napoli players
A.C. Carpi players
F.C. Crotone players
A.C. Perugia Calcio players
Palermo F.C. players
Amiens SC players
Wuhan F.C. players
Ascoli Calcio 1898 F.C. players
Serie C players
Serie A players
Serie B players
Ligue 1 players
Chinese Super League players
French expatriate footballers
Expatriate footballers in England
Expatriate footballers in Italy
Expatriate footballers in China
French expatriate sportspeople in England
French expatriate sportspeople in Italy
French expatriate sportspeople in China